The Vogelkop mountain rat, Rattus arfakiensis, is a species of rat native to Indonesia. It is found only in the Bird's Head Peninsula (possibly throughout the Arfak Mountains) of Papua Province, Indonesia.

References

Rattus
Mammals described in 1935